William R. Chipman (May 10, 1863 – October 7, 1932) was a member of the Wisconsin State Assembly during the 1917 and 1919 sessions. Other positions he held include justice of the peace, chairman of the Columbia County, Wisconsin Board of Supervisors and Chairman (similar to mayor) of Leeds, Wisconsin. He was a Republican.

Chipman was born in Leeds on May 10, 1863. He died at his home in Leeds in 1932.

References

External links

People from Leeds, Wisconsin
Republican Party members of the Wisconsin State Assembly
Mayors of places in Wisconsin
County supervisors in Wisconsin
American justices of the peace
1863 births
1932 deaths